Nakamura Shaji (Kabushiki Gaisha Nakamura Shaji) is a Japanese construction company located in Aichi Prefecture, Japan and is continuously working from 970. It is the second oldest Japanese construction company after Kongō Gumi.

Using wood working and carving the company specializes in building Buddhist temples and Shinto shrines.

The company website contains various construction related Shinto items.

See also
 List of oldest companies

References

External links
 Official website 

Construction and civil engineering companies of Japan
Engineering companies of Japan
Companies based in Aichi Prefecture
Companies established in the 10th century